
Gmina Krzywcza is a rural gmina (administrative district) in Przemyśl County, Subcarpathian Voivodeship, in south-eastern Poland.

The gmina contains part of the protected area called Pogórze Przemyskie Landscape Park.

Villages
Gmina Krzywcza contains the villages and settlements of Babice, Bachów, Chyrzyna, Krzywcza, Kupna, Reczpol, Ruszelczyce, Skopów, Średnia and Wola Krzywiecka.

Neighbouring gminas
Gmina Krzywcza is bordered by the gminas of Bircza, Dubiecko, Krasiczyn, Pruchnik, Przemyśl, Rokietnica and Roźwienica.

References

Polish official population figures 2006

Krzywcza
Przemyśl County